Bacall is a surname. Notable people with the surname include:

Aaron Bacall (born 1940), cartoonist of newspaper comic strips
Lauren Bacall (1924–2014), American film and stage actress and model, known for her distinctive husky voice and sultry looks
Michael Bacall (born 1973), American screenwriter and actor

See also
Bacall to Arms, a 1946 Warner Bros cartoon in the Merrie Melodies series
Bogart–Bacall syndrome, a vocal misuse disorder
Bahcall, a surname